Hush Kids is an American indie folk/alt-country band from Nashville, Tennessee, formed in 2018 by Jill Andrews and Peter Groenwald. The group released a self-titled album on October 26th that was produced by Ian Fitchuk. Hush Kids later released an extended play titled Weatherman on October 1, 2021.

Career 
Prior to the duo formation, Andrews and Groenwald had long been known for their personal musical projects, with Andrews as a founding member of The Everybodyfields and Groenwald as a collaborator with various artists like John Mayer and The Civil Wars. 

The duo met through their respective publishers in 2014 and have been called the “songwriting blind date that paid off.” Although the union was created a few years later, their first writing session proved fruitful when “What’s Your Hurry” was written. That same song eventually landed on Hush Kids, their self-titled debut album, four years later. Groenwald told Billboard, “Jill was the one who said, 'and we should start a band!' I felt like I couldn't say no, because she clearly has a lot going on and it's her idea to do this. I had to say yes.”

Members
 Jill Andrews (vocals, bass guitar, acoustic guitar)
 Peter Groenwald (vocals, bass guitar, piano)

Discography
 Hush Kids (2018)
 Weatherman (2021)

References

External links
Official website

American alternative country groups
Americana music groups
American indie folk groups
Country music groups from Tennessee